Gordon Stanley "Mickey" Cochrane (April 6, 1903 – June 28, 1962), nicknamed "Black Mike", was an American professional baseball player, manager and coach. He played in Major League Baseball as a catcher for the Philadelphia Athletics and Detroit Tigers. Cochrane was considered one of the best catchers in baseball history and is a member of the Baseball Hall of Fame. In his first season as manager, he led the Tigers to 101 wins, which was the most for a rookie manager for 27 years (since Cochrane, six other managers have won 100 games as a rookie).

Cochrane was born in Massachusetts and was a multi-sport athlete at Boston University. After college, he chose baseball over basketball and football. He made his major league debut in 1925, having spent only one season in the minor leagues. He was chosen as the American League (AL) Most Valuable Player in 1928 and he appeared in the World Series from 1929 to 1931. Philadelphia won the first two of those World Series, but Cochrane was criticized for giving up stolen bases when his team lost the series in 1931. Cochrane's career batting average (.320) is still an MLB record for a catcher.

Cochrane's career ended abruptly after a near-fatal head injury from a pitched ball in 1937. After his professional baseball career, he served in the United States Navy in World War II and ran an automobile business. Cochrane died of cancer in 1962. In 1999, The Sporting News ranked him 65th on its list of the 100 Greatest Baseball Players.

Playing career
Cochrane was born in Bridgewater, Massachusetts. His father, John Cochrane, had immigrated from Omagh, County Tyrone in what is now Northern Ireland and his mother, Sadie Campbell, had come from Prince Edward Island, Canada, whence her family had immigrated from Scotland. He was also known as "Black Mike" because of his fiery, competitive nature. Cochrane was educated at Boston University, where he played five sports, excelling at football and basketball.

Philadelphia Athletics
After just one season in the minor leagues, Cochrane was promoted to the major leagues, making his debut with the Philadelphia Athletics on April 14, 1925 at the age of 22. He made an immediate impact by becoming Connie Mack's starting catcher in place of Cy Perkins, who was considered one of the best catchers in the major leagues at the time. A left-handed batter, he ran well enough that Mack would occasionally have him bat leadoff. He hit third more often, but whatever his place in the order his primary role was to get on base so that hard-hitting Al Simmons and Jimmie Foxx could drive him in. In May, he tied a twentieth-century major league record by hitting three home runs in a game. He ended his rookie season with a .331 batting average and a .397 on-base percentage, helping the Athletics to a second-place finish.

By the start of the 1926 season, Cochrane was already considered the best catcher in the major leagues. He won the  American League Most Valuable Player Award, mostly for his leadership and defensive skills, when he led the American League in putouts and hit .293 along with 10 home runs and 58 runs batted in. Cochrane was a catalyst in the Athletics' pennant-winning years of 1929, 1930 and 1931, during which he hit .331, .357 and .349 respectively. He played in those three World Series, winning the first two, but was sometimes blamed for the loss of the 1931 World Series, when the St. Louis Cardinals, led by Pepper Martin, stole eight bases and the Series. However, in his book The Life of a Baseball Hall of Fame Catcher, author Charlie Bevis cites the Philadelphia pitching staff's carelessness in holding runners as a contributing factor. Notwithstanding this, the blame for the 1931 World Series loss dogged Cochrane for the rest of his life.

Detroit Tigers

In 1934, Mack started to disassemble his dynasty for financial reasons and put Cochrane on the trade block. He found a willing recipient in the Detroit Tigers. Their owner, Frank Navin, was also suffering from financial troubles. They had not finished higher than third since 1923, and had developed a reputation for being content with mediocrity. Attendance at Navin Field had sagged for some time. Navin had originally hoped to acquire Babe Ruth and name him player-manager, but after those talks fizzled, he turned to the A's. A deal to send Cochrane to Detroit was quickly arranged, and Navin immediately named him player-manager.

It was with Detroit where Cochrane cemented his reputation as a team leader and his competitive nature drove the Tigers, who had been picked to finish in fourth or fifth place, to the  American League championship, their first pennant in 25 years. They won 101 games, which was the most ever by the team for 34 years, and Cochrane was the first ever rookie manager to achieve 100 wins. Cochrane routinely platooned Gee Walker, a right-handed batter, to spell left fielder Goose Goslin and center fielder Jo-Jo White, who were both left-handed batters. Cochrane's leadership and strategic skills won him the 1934 Most Valuable Player Award, remarkable considering that Lou Gehrig had won the Triple Crown. In late 1935, the Detroit Free Press speculated Cochrane might eventually succeed Navin as team president. Due in part to his high-strung nature, as well as considerable pressure to join the Black Legion (political movement), then-prominent in the Detroit area, he suffered a nervous breakdown during the 1936 season.

On May 25, 1937, Cochrane was hit in the head by a pitch from Yankees pitcher Bump Hadley. Cochrane had homered in his previous at-bat that day. Hospitalized for seven days, Cochrane nearly died from the injury. This accident generated a call for protective helmets for batters, although tradition won out at that time. Cochrane was forced to retire at the age of 34 after doctors ordered him not to attempt to play baseball again.

Cochrane compiled a .320 batting average while hitting 119 home runs and 830 runs batted in over a 13-year playing career. He also had 1,652 hits, 1,041 runs scored, 333 doubles, 64 triples, 64 stolen bases and a .478 slugging percentage. His .320 batting average is the highest career mark for catchers. His .419 on-base percentage is among the best in baseball history, and is the highest all-time among catchers. In , he became the first major league catcher to score 100 runs and produce 100 runs batted in during the same season.

He hit for the cycle twice in his career, on July 22, 1932 and August 2, 1933.

In his first 11 years, he never caught fewer than 110 games. He led American League catchers six times in putouts and twice each in double plays assists and fielding percentage.

Cochrane returned to the dugout to continue managing the Tigers but had lost his competitive fire. He managed for the remainder of the 1937 season but was replaced midway through the 1938 season by coach and former catcher Del Baker. His all-time managerial record was 348-250, for a .582 winning percentage.

Later life and legacy
Despite his head injury, Cochrane served in the United States Navy during World War II. Commissioned as a lieutenant and assigned to Naval Station Great Lakes, he oversaw physical training of new recruits and coached the baseball team. On July 7, 1942, Cochrane managed an All-Service team that played against an American League all-star squad at Cleveland’s Municipal Stadium; the American League team beat the servicemen, 5-0. Later in the war Cochrane, by now a lieutenant commander, was assigned to a similar role in the Pacific Theater.

In 1947, Cochrane became the third catcher enshrined in the Baseball Hall of Fame, after Roger Bresnahan and Buck Ewing. Long after the Athletics left Philadelphia for Kansas City in 1954 without retiring his uniform number 2, the Philadelphia Phillies honored him by electing him to the Philadelphia Baseball Wall of Fame at Veterans Stadium. The Athletics' plaques from that display have since been moved to the Philadelphia Athletics Museum in Hatboro, Pennsylvania. The Tigers honored him by renaming National Avenue (behind the third-base stands of the old Tiger Stadium) Cochrane Avenue. Despite making the Hall of Fame, The Tigers did not retire his uniform number No. 3. 

71 years later, it was retired for Alan Trammell — 22 years after his retirement.

Cochrane briefly worked in baseball after World War II, notably serving as a coach, and then as general manager, of the Athletics during the  season, Mack's last year as manager. He also owned an automobile business after his baseball days; he sold it in the mid-1950s. A heavy smoker, Cochrane was only 59 when he died in 1962 in Lake Forest, Illinois of lymphatic cancer.

In his book, The Bill James Historical Baseball Abstract, baseball historian Bill James ranked Cochrane fourth all-time among major league catchers. In 1999, he was ranked 65th on The Sporting News list of the 100 Greatest Baseball Players, and was a nominee for the Major League Baseball All-Century Team. Yankee Hall of Fame slugger Mickey Mantle was named after him.

In 2013, the Bob Feller Act of Valor Award honored Cochrane as one of 37 Baseball Hall of Fame members for his service in the United States Navy during World War II.

See also
 List of Major League Baseball career runs scored leaders
 List of Major League Baseball players to hit for the cycle
 List of Major League Baseball player-managers

References

Further reading

Mickey Cochrane at TheHitters.com

External links

 Baseball: The Fans' Game Manuscript at Dartmouth College Library

1903 births
1962 deaths
Baseball players from Massachusetts
Boston University Terriers baseball players
Major League Baseball catchers
American League All-Stars
Major League Baseball general managers
National Baseball Hall of Fame inductees
Major League Baseball player-managers
Deaths from cancer in Illinois
Detroit Tigers managers
Detroit Tigers players
Detroit Tigers executives
Detroit Tigers scouts
New York Yankees scouts
Philadelphia Athletics coaches
Philadelphia Athletics players
Philadelphia Athletics executives
Portland Beavers players
People from Bridgewater, Massachusetts
Dover Senators players
American League Most Valuable Player Award winners
World Series-winning managers
20th-century American philanthropists
Deaths from lymphoma
20th-century American Episcopalians
Sportspeople from Plymouth County, Massachusetts
United States Navy personnel of World War II
United States Navy officers
Military personnel from Massachusetts